Saint John the Baptist is a c. 1540 painting of John the Baptist by Titian, with his traditional attributes of the Lamb of God and a staff. It is part of the collection of the Gallerie dell'Accademia of Venice, Italy.

In the background of the painting is a landscape with the river Jordan, in which Jesus was baptised.

Bibliography
   Marion Kaminski "Sztuka i architektura Wenecja'', wyd Wydawnictwo Olesiejuk

References

1540 paintings
Religious paintings by Titian
Paintings depicting John the Baptist
Sheep in art